Roman Smirnov (born October 29, 1986) is a Belarusian long track speed skater who participates in international competitions.

Personal records

Career highlights

European Allround Championships
2008 - Kolomna,  31st
World Junior Allround Championships
2005 - Seinäjoki, 39th
2006 - Erfurt, 26th

External links

Smirnov at Jakub Majerski's Speedskating Database
Smirnov at SkateResults.com

1986 births
Belarusian male speed skaters
Living people